This is a list of Japan international footballers – Japanese association football players who have played for the Japan national football team as recorded by the Japan Football Association.

Players
Source: 

 Bold players have been called up to the Japan national football team in the last 12 months.

See also
List of Japan international footballers born outside Japan

References

External links
Japan Football Association 
 日本代表　試合別出場記録 by the Japan Football Association

  
Lists of Japanese football players
Japan
Footballers
international footballers
Association football player non-biographical articles